AISJ may refer to:

 American International School of Jeddah, Saudi Arabia
 American International School of Johannesburg, South Africa